West Curry is a farm north of Bennacott in north Cornwall, England, UK.

It appears in the Domesday Book (1086) as Chori, where in 1086 Iovin the Craftsman held it from Robert, Count of Mortain.

References

Farms in Cornwall